Kang La Pass or Kang La is a mountain pass in the Manang District of Gandaki Province of Nepal. The path starts in Nar village.

References

Mountain passes of Nepal
Mountains of the Gandaki Province